You Are My Love (Spanish:Mi amor eres tú) is a 1941 Argentine comedy film directed by Manuel Romero and starring Paulina Singerman, Arturo García Buhr and Severo Fernández.

Cast
 Paulina Singerman as Susana  
 Arturo García Buhr as Roberto Almada  
 Severo Fernández as Lucas  
 Enrique Roldán as Arturo  
 Emilia Helda as Dora  
 Cayetano Biondo as Don Ramón 
 Rosa Martín as Secretary

References

Bibliography 
 Andrés Insaurralde. Manuel Romero. Centro Editor de América Latina, 1994.

External links 
 

1941 films
Argentine comedy films
1941 comedy films
1940s Spanish-language films
Films directed by Manuel Romero
Argentine black-and-white films
1940s Argentine films